"Rumors" is a song by San Francisco Bay Area-based music group Timex Social Club, from their debut album Vicious Rumors. It was a top-10 hit in the United States, Canada, Ireland, the Netherlands, and New Zealand, reaching No. 8 on the US Billboard Hot 100. It also topped the US R&B and dance charts.

Charts

Weekly charts

Year-end charts

Certifications

Parodies
The song was parodied as "Roaches" by Bobby Jimmy and the Critters, also released in 1986.

See also

List of number-one singles of 1986 (Canada)
List of number-one R&B singles of 1986 (U.S.)
List of number-one dance singles of 1986 (U.S.)

References

1986 singles
1986 songs
Post-disco songs
RPM Top Singles number-one singles